Brucknell is a locality in Victoria, Australia.  The town is located in the Shire of Corangamite.

References

Towns in Victoria (Australia)
Shire of Corangamite